Twenty Two Recordings is an American independent record label founded by Arthur Burton III. The label is distributed through Twenty Two Music Group Distribution.

Artists

Current artists
Jason Little
Tamika Scott
Evin Gibson
Eddie Levert
Raz B
Cassidy
Ali Campbell
Rome
Donnie Klang
Sammie
337 Mafia
Lil Jackson
M.T.B. 
DePaul (WhoMadethebeat)
D$Money
Emanny
Mr. Fresh
Ignite the Borealis
Bam Rodgers
Lil Trap
Lisa Denise
Tomeca Marsden
Jamario Love
Charlie Hustle
Toshman Powell
Kenny Lewis & One Voice
Fool Fareal
Maxee Maxwell (deceased)

DJs
DJ QUETTE

Former artists
Lil Flip
Outlawz
Dead Prez
Infamous Mobb
Prodigy
Mercan Dede
Toots and The Maytals
Mary Ramsey
10,000 Maniacs
Fishbone
Jesus Jones
Deep Forest
Modern English
Midge Ure
Dave Eggar & The Flux Quartet
MF Doom Maxim
Thomas Mapfumo
Bana
Diblo Dibala
Mercan Dede

Subsidiary labels
Mi5 Recordings
Suthun Music Entertainment
RMG Music Group
Str8 Wired Entertainment
Muddy Dreams Ent
Rich Heart Entertainment
Dreambridge Entertainment

Discography

American independent record labels
Universal Music Group